The 1898 Washington football team was an American football team that represented the University of Washington during the 1898 college football season. In its third, non-consecutive season under coach Ralph Nichols, the team compiled a 1–1 record and outscored its opponents by a combined total of 24 to 18. Clarence Larson was the team captain.

Schedule

References

Washington
Washington Huskies football seasons
Washington football